Stanisław Rydzoń (born 8 March 1950 in Brzezinka) is a Polish politician. He was elected to Sejm on 25 September 2005, getting 7,787 votes in 12 Chrzanów district as a candidate from Democratic Left Alliance list.

He was also a member of Sejm 2001-2005.

See also
Members of Polish Sejm 2005-2007

External links
Stanisław Rydzoń - parliamentary page - includes declarations of interest, voting record, and transcripts of speeches.

1950 births
Living people
Democratic Left Alliance politicians
Members of the Polish Sejm 2001–2005
Members of the Polish Sejm 2005–2007
Members of the Polish Sejm 2007–2011